Evangelos Mytilineos (Greek: Ευάγγελος Μυτιληναίος, born in Athens in 1954) is a Greek businessman, chairman of the board of directors of MYTILINEOS that he founded in 1990.

Early life 
Born in Athens in 1954, Evangelos Mytilineos holds a BSc in Economics from the University of Athens and an MSc in Economics from the London School of Economics. In 2019 he was awarded an honorary doctorate from the Department of Business Administration and Management at the University of Piraeus.

Career
Evangelos Mytilineos is the Chairman and CEO of MYTILINEOS, one of Greece’s leading companies with strong presence in all five continents. MYTILINEOS’ activities expand in 4 business units: Power & Gas, Metallurgy, Sustainable Engineering Solutions and Renewables & Storage Development, with revenues exceeding €1,9 billion in 2020 and more than 3,660 direct and indirect employees. 

In 1978, Evangelos Mytilineos took over the family business, which was founded in 1908 and represented metal and steel product manufacturers. In 1990 he established MYTILINEOS Holdings Group. With strategic acumen, Evangelos Mytilineos expanded the company’s operations by acquiring the majority shareholding of metal construction company METKA S.A. as well as that of Aluminium of Greece, eventually positioning it as the largest fully vertically integrated producer of alumina and aluminum in Europe. In 1995, MYTILINEOS Holdings Group was listed in the Athens Stock Exchange while in the early 2000s, MYTILINEOS entered the energy sector with Protergia, which today is the Group’s flagship company.  

In 2017, following Evangelos Mytilineos proposal, the General Assemblies of MYTILINEOS Group and METKA approved the corporate transformation of the Group with all subsidiaries:  Aluminum of Greece, METKA and Protergia merging into a new single business entity. In 2018, MYTILINEOS acquired 97,87% of EPALME, the largest independent producer of recycled aluminum and 100% of M&M Gas S.A. (MNG Trading). In 2019, MYTILINEOS announced being the sole shareholder (100%) of METKA EGN, a company focused on development and construction of utility scale projects for the global solar power and energy storage markets. 

In 2021, Evangelos Mytilineos set the ground for a 100% sustainable and green industrial operation. He announced the acquisition of EGNATIA GROUP, with a 1485MW PV and 1240MW Energy Storage portfolio, which will immediately enter the construction phase, and at the same time a 30% emissions reduction target for 2030 and aspiring to reach net zero emissions by 2050 and positioning MYTILINEOS as one of the first companies in Europe and one of the first industries globally, that embed bold sustainable growth targets in business operations.  

Today, Evangelos Mytilineos is Vice President of the Hellenic Federation of Enterprises (SEV) and President of SEV’s Energy Committee.

Awards and recognition  
October 13th, 2022, Evangelos Mytilineos was elected President of Eurometaux, the European association for non-ferrous metals.

During 2018, Mytilineos was announced as the winner and awarded the 2018 Hellenic Capital Link Leadership Award due to his work and contributions to the Greek economy. The award was part of Capital Link's 20th investment forum presented in New York.

References 

Greek chief executives
Greek billionaires
Mytilineos SA
Living people
Place of birth missing (living people)
1954 births